Global Genes is a global non-profit advocacy organization for individuals and families fighting rare and genetic diseases. The organization is associated with a blue denim "Genes Ribbon" that is intended to raise awareness of patients affected by rare and genetic diseases. Global Genes uses a simple concept of "jeans and genes" to promote awareness of rare disease; its slogan is "Allies in Rare Disease".

History
The organization was founded in 2009, and is associated with several rare disease awareness campaigns a numerous fundraising efforts.

The organization has gained recognition for campaigns and annual involvement in promoting Rare Disease Day.

References

External links
Global Genes

Medical and health organizations based in California
Genetic diseases and disorders